Günther Angern (5 March 1893 – 2 February 1943) was a German general in the Wehrmacht during World War II who commanded the 16th Panzer Division during the Battle of Stalingrad. He was also a recipient of the Knight's Cross of the Iron Cross of Nazi Germany.

Biography
Born in Kolberg, Angern joined the army of Imperial Germany as an Fahnen-junker (officer cadet). He was commissioned in the infantry and fought in World War I. In the interwar period, he joined the Wehrmacht and by 1938 was commander of the 3rd Schützen (Rifle) Brigade. The following year he led the 11th Schützen Brigade. In August 1940, now an oberst, he was awarded the Knight's Cross of the Iron Cross while commanding the brigade.

On 15 August 1941, during the later stages of Operation Barbarossa, Angern was given command of the 11th Panzer Division. His time leading the division was brief, for he was wounded nine days later. He had a long period off active duty because of his wounds and during this time was promoted to generalmajor and received the German Cross in Gold.

Returning to duty on 15 September 1942, Angern took command of the 16th Panzer Division, operating to the north of the city of Stalingrad, supporting the divisions fighting in the city. The Red Army began a counteroffensive which encircled Stalingrad, trapping several elements of the division, including Angern and his staff, in the city along with the Sixth Army. Angern remained in Stalingrad throughout the siege and was promoted to generalleutnant on 21 January 1943.

The advance of the Red Army pressed the Germans into the eastern portion of the Stalingrad perimeter and in mid-January, along with some other staff officers of the division, Angern considered escaping the encirclement by passing through the frontlines wearing captured Red Army uniforms accompanied by Russian Hiwis. Nothing came of the plan and, with defeat inevitable, Angern committed suicide on 2 February 1943.

Notes
Footnotes

Citations

References

 
 
 
 

1893 births
1943 deaths
People from Kołobrzeg
People from the Province of Pomerania
Reichswehr personnel
Lieutenant generals of the German Army (Wehrmacht)
German Army personnel of World War I
Prussian Army personnel
Recipients of the Gold German Cross
Recipients of the Knight's Cross of the Iron Cross
German military personnel who committed suicide
German commanders at the Battle of Stalingrad
Recipients of the clasp to the Iron Cross, 1st class
Suicides in the Soviet Union